Eremophila recurva is a flowering plant in the figwort family, Scrophulariaceae and is endemic to Australia. It is a shrub with hairy grey leaves, large grey sepals and blue, mauve or lilac flowers.

Description
Its branches and leaves are densely covered with grey or yellowish branched hairs giving them a felt-like appearance. The leaves are arranged alternately and are densely clustered near the ends of the branches.

The petal tube is lilac-coloured, mauve or violet on the outside, while the inside of the tube is cream-coloured with faint lilac spots. The outside surface of the tube is glabrous except for the edges of the lobes. The inner surface of the lobes is glabrous but the inside of the tube is densely filled with woolly hairs. The 4 stamens are fully enclosed in the petal tube.

Taxonomy and naming 
This species was first formally described by Robert Chinnock in 2007 and the description was published in Eremophila and Allied Genera: A Monograph of the Plant Family Myoporaceae. The specific epithet (recurva) is a Latin word meaning "bent backwards" referring to the edges of the sepals.

Distribution and habitat
Eremophila recurva occurs between Gascoyne Junction and Dairy Creek to the east in the Carnarvon and Gascoyne biogeographic regions where it grows in red sand on plains or stony flats.

Conservation
Eremophila recurva is classified as "not threatened" by the Western Australian Government Department of Parks and Wildlife.

Use in horticulture
The silvery-grey foliage and lilac-coloured flowers of this compact shrub are its main attractions. It can be propagated from cuttings but most cultivated shrubs have been grown from grafting onto Myoporum rootstock. It grows best in well-drained soil in full sun but only needs an occasional watering during a long drought and is tolerant of light to moderate frosts.

References

Eudicots of Western Australia
recurva
Endemic flora of Western Australia
Plants described in 2007
Taxa named by Robert Chinnock